The Butte Creek Volcanic Sandstone is a geologic formation in Oregon. It preserves fossils dating back to the Neogene period.

See also

 List of fossiliferous stratigraphic units in Oregon
 Paleontology in Oregon

References
 

Geologic formations of Oregon
Neogene stratigraphic units of North America